Guillermo Padula Lenna (born 16 September 1997) is a Uruguayan footballer who plays as a centre back for Swiss club Bellinzona.

Career
Padula started his career with Uruguayan second division side Plaza Colonia, helping them earn promotion and win the 2015–16 Uruguayan Primera División. On 5 April 2014, Padula made his league debut for Plaza Colonia during a 1-0 win over Rampla Juniors. On 27 September 2015, Padula scored his first goal for Plaza Colonia during a 1-1 draw with Juventud (Las Piedras). After that, he signed for FC Mendrisio in the Swiss fourth division. 

In 2019, Padula signed for Swiss third division club Bellinzona.

Before the second half of 2019–20, he signed for FC Paradiso in the Swiss fourth division.

In 2020, he signed for Swiss second division team FCS.

References

External links
 
 

1997 births
Living people
Uruguayan footballers
Uruguayan expatriate footballers
People from Colonia del Sacramento
Association football defenders
Uruguay youth international footballers
Club Plaza Colonia de Deportes players
FC Mendrisio players
AC Bellinzona players
FC Schaffhausen players
Swiss Challenge League players
Swiss Promotion League players
Uruguayan Primera División players
Uruguayan Segunda División players
Uruguayan expatriate sportspeople in Switzerland
Expatriate footballers in Switzerland